Wingmore is a small village between Canterbury and Folkestone in Kent, England. It is situated in the Elham Valley approximately halfway between the larger villages of Elham and Barham on the B2065. It consists of a few cottages and farms. The population at the 2011 Census was included in the civil parish of Elham

References

External links

Villages in Kent